João Vaz Corte-Real (c. 1420 – 1496) was a Portuguese sailor, claimed by some accounts to have been an explorer of a land called Terra Nova do Bacalhau (New Land of the Codfish), speculated to possibly have been a part of North America. For his efforts, Corte-Real was offered the Donatário-Captaincies of São Jorge and Angra, respectively.

Biography
A member of the Corte-Real family, João Vaz was the father of Miguel and Gaspar Corte-Real, who some claim accompanied him on his voyage. Fragmentary evidence suggests the expedition in 1473 was a joint venture between the kings of Portugal and Denmark, and that Corte-Real accompanied the German sailors Didrik Pining and Hans Pothorst, as well as (the possibly mythical) John Scolvus.

The claim that he discovered Terra Nova do Bacalhau (literally, New Land of the Codfish) originated from Gaspar Frutuoso's book Saudades de terra from around 1570-80. There is speculation that this otherwise unidentified isle was Newfoundland. Frutuoso further suggested that Corte-Real was granted part of Terceira because of this discovery. This is contrasted by his contemporary grant which says nothing about any discovery, but explains his grant with the "expenses he had incurred" and "services rendered". Because of the lack of corroborating evidence, the claims of discovery remain entirely speculative.

Donatário
It is known that Corte-Real was originally granted the island of São Jorge in the archipelago of the Azores in 1472, which he held until 1474. From this point onward he was granted the captaincy of Angra on Terceira by the Infanta Beatrice, Duchess of Viseu, and approved by the King, following the disappearance of Jacome de Bruges. Bruges was the original Captain-Donatário, but following his disappearance, the King had divided the island between Angra and Praia, granting Praia to Álvaro Martins Homem, while Corte-Real obtained Angra. He took-up residence in the burgh and set about promoting its settlement, but the division of the island into two Captaincies did not assist the island's growth.

Later life
He and his wife, D. Maria de Abarca, were buried in the presbytery of the church of the Convent of São Francisco. His descendants did not live in the Capitania of Angra, instead sending ouvidores, magistrates, to the territory to administer the possessions.

See also 

 Timeline of the European colonization of North America
 Didrik Pining
 Álvaro Martins

References
Notes

Sources

 

Corte-Real Joao Vaz
1420 births
1496 deaths
Portuguese explorers
Portuguese explorers of North America
15th-century explorers
15th-century Portuguese people
Maritime history of Portugal
 Pre-Columbian trans-oceanic contact